Punisher P.O.V. is a four-issue comic book limited series featuring Frank Castle, also known as the Punisher. The series was published in 1991 and written by Jim Starlin with art by Bernie Wrightson.

Publication history
Book One: Foresight, July 1991
Book Two: Extrospection, August 1991
Book Three: Introspection, September 1991
Book Four: Hindsight, December 1991

Plot
The four-issue series revolves around the Punisher hunting down a former 1960s radical who was released from prison only to be horribly disfigured when a bomb he and his friend were working on exploded. After exposure to toxic waste, the disfigured radical becomes almost unkillable due to the chemicals mutating him, giving him an accelerated healing factor.

See also
 1991 in comics

References

External links
 Punisher P.O.V. at the Comic Book DB

Horror comics
1991 comics debuts
1991 comics endings
Comics by Jim Starlin